The 2010 FIM Motocross World Championship was the 54th season of World Championship motocross competition. It consisted of three different classes; MX1 and MX2 classes over 15 events beginning on April 4 in Sevlievo, Bulgaria and ending on September 12 in Fermo, Italy, and MX3 over 12 events also beginning on April 4 in Cortelha, Portugal and ending on September 5 in Geneva, Switzerland.

Red Bull KTM Factory Racing's Antonio Cairoli dominated the MX1 class, taking exactly half of the victories on offer; 15 victories and 23 podiums in total allowed him to claim his second successive championship title by 88 points, scoring points in all bar two races. Clément Desalle took a career-best second-place finish in the standings, riding for the Teka Suzuki team. Desalle took victories at Mantova, Ķegums and Fermo as he finished 35 points clear of the top-placed Yamaha rider in the championship, David Philippaerts of the Yamaha Monster Energy Motocross Team. Philippaerts won just two races during the season – at Saint-Jean-d'Angély and Campo Grande – but finished each of the season's 30 races within the points-awarding placings as he held off Cairoli's team-mate Maximilian Nagl, a four-time race-winner, by four points. The top five was completed by Fermo race-winner Steve Ramon, seven points behind Nagl. Other victories were taken by Honda's Tanel Leok at Bellpuig and Loket, Yamaha's Ken De Dycker who took a double at Teutschenthal and Ben Townley, who made a one-off appearance for Honda at Glen Helen. KTM won the Manufacturers' Championship by 67 points ahead of Suzuki.

MX2 was also won by a rider from the Red Bull KTM Factory Racing team, as Marvin Musquin repeated the feat of Cairoli in MX1, by defending the season-end red plate for the championship winner. Musquin started the season with consecutive doubles at Sevlievo and Mantova before adding further doubles at Águeda, Glen Helen and Saint-Jean-d'Angély en route to a grand total of 14 victories, 23 podiums and a championship-winning margin of 61 points over runner-up Ken Roczen of the Teka Suzuki team. Roczen took ten victories during the season, eight of which coming during the final eleven races of the season. Third place went to Kawasaki Team CLS rider Steven Frossard, who claimed ten podium places but only had one win to show from it, coming at Uddevalla in Sweden. The top five was rounded out by Yamaha UK's Zach Osborne and JM Racing Team KTM's Joel Roelants, who took several podiums each but failed to win a race. Only two other riders took victories during the season; KTM's Jeffrey Herlings took four but slipped to sixth in the championship after missing the final three events due to a shoulder injury, and Yamaha's Gautier Paulin, who took a sole victory at Lierop during a part-season. KTM won the Manufacturers' Championship by 88 points ahead of Suzuki.

MX3 was between two riders, who did battle for the title on their respective machinery. Yamaha's Carlos Campano and Husqvarna's Alex Salvini shared 18 of the season's 24 race wins between them, but it was Campana that prevailed for the championship, by 24 points. Campano's advantage over another Husqvarna rider and third place championship finisher Matevz Irt was 150 points; Irt having claimed seven podium finishes without success. The top five was completed by Martin Zerava and Milko Potisek, with Potisek claiming a race win at Schwedt in Germany, during the season. Other victories were taken by riders during one-off appearances; Mickaël Pichon and Julien Bill claimed doubles at their respective home events at Castelnau-de-Lévis and Geneva, while Toni Eriksson took one win at Vantaa. Yamaha won the Manufacturers' Championship by just 15 points over Husqvarna.

Rule changes
A maximum of 26 riders will be entered for the entire FIM MX1 World Championship, and in addition 2 FMNR wild card riders and another 2 wild card riders (which Youthstream will use in order to support teams’ and local organisers’ requests for extra riders) will be entered per event. The Regulations allow up to 40 riders, but to increase the quality, the FIM want to try to keep MX1 with a maximum of 30 riders. The MX2 class will be for riders less than 23 years old. The FIM will only accept teams with 2 riders in one class.

2010 Calendar
The 2010 calendars of the FIM Motocross World Championships promoted by Youthstream were finalised on 29 October 2009. In February 2010, there was some changes in the calendar.

Championship standings

MX1

Riders' Championship
(key)

Manufacturers' Championship

MX2

Riders' Championship
(key)

Manufacturers' Championship

MX3

Riders' Championship

Manufacturers' Championship

Participants
 Riders with red background numbers are defending champions. All riders were announced with numbers on February 5, 2010.

MX1 participants

MX2 participants

MX3 participants

References

External links
 

Motocross
Motocross World Championship seasons